Leskov may refer to
Ivan Leskov (born 1977), Russian football player
Nikolai Leskov (1831–1895), Russian novelist
Leskov Island in the southern Atlantic Ocean
Leskov Island (Antarctica) in the West Ice Shelf of Antarctica

See also
Leskova